Banjo the Woodpile Cat is a 1979 animated short film directed by Don Bluth. It follows the story of Banjo, an overly curious and rebellious kitten who, after getting into trouble for falling from a house to see if he could land on his feet, runs away from his woodpile home in his owners' farm in Payson, Utah by catching a truck to Salt Lake City. Produced on a shoestring budget, and created in Bluth's garage, the film took four years to make and it was the first production of Don Bluth Productions, later Sullivan Bluth Studios. It premiered theatrically on November 16, 1979, and at the USA Film Festival one year later. It was released on DVD by 20th Century Fox Home Entertainment on May 20, 2014.

Plot 
In a woodpile on a farm in Payson, Utah, a rambunctious orange kitten named Banjo constantly makes mischief, to his family's dismay. After Banjo disobeys his father's warnings of learning to mind Banjo's little sisters and, after one of Banjo's stunts nearly gets his little sisters killed, Banjo's father prepares to spank the kitten and orders Banjo to retrieve the switch that will be used against him; Banjo instead runs away. He hitches a ride on a feed truck to Salt Lake City.

In the big city, Banjo finds excitement at first, but soon he causes a massive traffic accident. He eventually retreats to the alleys, homesick and hungry during a thunderstorm. Another cat named Crazy Legs discovers Banjo and offers to help him find his way back home. During their search one snowy night, Crazy Legs and Banjo come to a nightclub and enlist the help of more cats, including a singing cat trio (Cleo, Melina and Zazu). Later that night, while searching for the truck that could take him back to the farm, Banjo and Crazy Legs are chased by a pack of dogs. The pair barely escape and end up at the singing cats' home for the night.

The next morning, Banjo wakes up and hears the driver of the truck out in the street. The cats rejoice and say many goodbyes before Banjo gets on the truck and eventually reunites with his family, who are happy to see him home.

Cast 
 Sparky Marcus as Banjo
 Scatman Crothers as Crazy Legs
 Beah Richards as Zazu

Additional voices 
 Jerry Harper as Freeman (Feed Truck Driver)
 Ken Sansom as Farmer / Warehouse Man / Papa Cat
 Ann E. Beasley as Jean
 Robin Muir as Emily
 Georgette Rampone as Mama Cat / Cleo / Melina

Singers 
 Jackie Ward - Melina
 Sally Stevens - Cleo
 Sue Allen - Zazu

Production 
This film was started as a side project, while Don Bluth was still working at Walt Disney Productions. Bluth had previously considered producing a short film based on the fairy tale The Pied Piper of Hamelin, but felt that it was too large a production. He invited several other young animators to his house on nights and weekends to discover secrets of classical animation that he felt had been lost at Disney. The team worked in Bluth's garage. Bluth, and animators such as Gary Goldman, felt that Disney were only attempting to reduce the cost of films without paying attention to any artistic values. Eventually he resigned from Disney, along with 17 other animators, to finish this film and begin The Secret of NIMH. That bold walk-out caused a delay in the release of Disney's The Fox and the Hound which was still in mid-production. The story is partially based on one of Don Bluth's real-life experiences: While living on a farm, his family's cat, who lived in a woodpile nearby, disappeared, only to return to the farm several weeks later.

During the filming stage, it was considered to become a feature film. It included a fleshed-out villain: a scarred, cigar-smoking cat named Rocko, who bears similarities to Warren T. Rat (from An American Tail) and Carface Caruthers (from All Dogs Go to Heaven). A termite that saves Banjo from a group of young children in Salt Lake City later became Digit in An American Tail. The tone of the film was darker and more akin to All Dogs Go to Heaven, and the climactic battle between Crazy Legs and Rocko was inspired by Disney's The Jungle Book. However, it was found that padding the film and adding darker elements did not strengthen the storyline, so the filmmakers kept the film as a short.

It was considered to be made into a Christmas special, and would have featured live-action scenes of Sparky Marcus talking to Santa Claus, and the animation would have more of a Christmas theme. Don Bluth recalled: "We forced Christmas into it, and it didn't work". Despite this claim, Crazy Legs briefly wearing the Santa Claus suit, the wintry landscapes, and decorations, are still evident in the final film.

Don Bluth pitched this film, during pre-production, to then-studio head Ron W. Miller, as a future property for Disney. Seeing no value in it, Miller turned it down.

The rain and snow effects seen in this movie are re-used live-action passes, thrown away by the Disney studio, in favor of cheaper and faster techniques.

Spin-off 
A Dragon's Lair-esque version of the film under the name Banjo the Woodpile Cat Adventure Game was developed and released on the iPhone and iPod Touch by Iconic Apps in March 2009.

Potential sequel 
Although there has been interest in a revival of the film and characters, including a sequel Banjo Meets the King of the Goblins, Bluth has stated that he so far wishes to leave the film behind.

References

External links 
 
 
 Cawley, John Banjo the Woodpile Cat (book excerpts)
 Banjo the Woodpile Cat at Don Markstein's Toonopedia. Archived from the original on February 22, 2018.
 The 1979 short on Internet Archive

American Broadcasting Company television specials
ABC Weekend Special
1979 films
1979 animated films
1979 short films
1970s American animated films
1970s animated short films
Films set in Utah
American animated short films
Films directed by Don Bluth
Films with screenplays by Don Bluth
Films set in 1944
Fictional cats
Sullivan Bluth Studios films
American animated television films
Animated films about cats
1970s children's animated films
Films produced by Don Bluth and Gary Goldman
Films produced by John Pomeroy
1970s English-language films